Claire Karekezi is a Neurosurgeon (born 1982) at the Rwanda Military Hospital in Kigali, Rwanda. As the first woman neurosurgeon in Rwanda, and one of six neurosurgeons serving a population of 13 million, Karekezi serves as an advocate for women in neurosurgery. She has become an inspiration for young people pursuing neurosurgery, particularly young women.

Karekezi specializes in neuro oncology and skull-base surgery, is the acting chairperson of the African Women in Neurosurgery (AWIN), Committee of the Continental Association of African Neurosurgical Societies (CAANS), and was elected as a member of the national council of the Rwanda Medical and Dental Council (RMDC) and the Secretary of the bureau for 2022-2026.

Early life 
Karekezi was born in Butare, Rwanda. Mr.  Karekezi Sr., her father, was a telecommunications engineer, and Mrs. Musine, her mother, was a high school teacher. Karekezi grew up in Kigali, the capital city of Rwanda, where she and her two older siblings received their early education. She enjoyed science as a child, and after sixth grade in elementary school, she majored in mathematics and physics in high school. She met the admissions criteria for medical school and studied general medicine in Butare at the University of Rwanda College of Medicine and Health Sciences, graduating as an MD in March 2009. During her time in Butare, Karekezi had her first exposure to neurosurgery, an 
experience that changed the course of her life.

Education 
The journey of Karekezi began at the College of Medicine and Health Sciences, University of Rwanda (UR), where she graduated with honors in Medicine in 2009. In 2007, Karekezi participated in an International Federation of Medical Student's Associations (IFMSA) professional exchange at the Linköping Teaching Hospital in Sweden. There, she met professor Jan Hillman, who had a significant impact on her decision to pursue a career in neurosurgery. In February 2009, following a brief stay in Sweden, Karekezi completed an elective program at the Department of Neurosurgery, John Radcliffe Hospital, Oxford University. Both training experiences sparked her interest in Neurosurgery and granted her the confidence to pursue a career in the field.

In 2011, she was accepted into the World Federation of Neurosurgical Societies (WFNS) Reference center in Rabat for the training of African neurosurgeons. This training center was established in 2002 through a partnership between the WFNS and the Faculty of Medicine and Pharmacy of Rabat at Mohammed V University in Rabat, Morocco. Karekezi completed her residency in neurosurgery in 2016.

After completing her residency in Morocco Karekezi pursued additional training with a focus on neuro oncology. In 2016, she spent three months at the Brigham and Women's Hospital in Boston, Massachusetts, as a recipient of the American Association of Neurological Surgeons (AANS) International Visiting Surgeon Fellowship. From 2017 to 2018, she completed a one-year clinical fellowship in neuro oncology and Skull Base Surgery   at Toronto Western Hospital.

After completing her fellowship in Toronto in December 2018, Karekezi returned to Rwanda as the country's first female neurosurgeon. In her 2018 TEDxEuston talk, Karekezi painted a clearer picture of the general lack of access to surgery in Africa and the role she plays in training more future neurosurgeons to address this deficit. Karekezi stated, "I refuse to allow being African and a woman to be a limitation for me." She has raised awareness about the significance of neurosurgical education on the African continent, the need for more female neurosurgeons to combat stereotypes, and the  severe shortage of neurosurgeons in the continent.

Professional career and mission 
Karekezi joined the Rwanda Military Hospital (RMH) in January 2019 as the hospital's first consultant neurosurgeon and the first neurosurgeon to perform neurosurgical procedures there. The establishment of a neurosurgery practice in the Rwandan public health sector has not been devoid of obstacles. Upon establishing her practice at RMH, she devoted the first few months of her tenure to establishing a functional neurosurgical unit by acquiring the necessary surgical equipment and personnel.

Neurosurgery continues to be a male-dominated field, particularly in Africa, where women neurosurgeons account for less than 12% of all neurosurgeons. Karekezi is determined to enhance mentorship and support for her female colleagues and future generations. In 2019, she was elected as the chair of the African Women in Neurosurgery (AWIN) section of the Continental Association of African Neurosurgical Societies (CAANS).

Karekezi has led numerous projects on the history of women in neurosurgery and their current status on the African continent, highlighting the underrepresentation of women in leadership positions and academic neurosurgery, particularly in Sub-Saharan Africa. She continues to raise awareness about the need for more experienced female neurosurgeons in order to assist other young women in overcoming various obstacles inherent to the field.  She is also an advocate and inspiration for other young women who wish to pursue STEM fields (science, engineering, technology, and mathematics).

Awards 
 American Association of Neurological Surgeons (AANS)/Congress of Neurological Surgeons (CNS) Women In Neurosurgery (WINS) Greg Wilkins-Barrick Chair Visiting International Surgeon Award (2013).
 American Association of Neurological Surgeons (AANS) International Visiting Surgeon Fellowship Award in Neurosurgery/neuro oncology, Brigham and Women's Hospital, Harvard Medical School, USA (2016). 
 Shield Maiden Women in Surgery Africa (WISA) Award in recognition of the arête in achieving career excellence in surgery, COSECSA, Kigali (2018). 
 AIMS-Next Einstein Initiative TTP Women in science ‘First Award 2019’ for being Rwanda’s First Female Neurosurgeon (2019). 
 Forbes Woman Africa Academic Excellence Award (2022).

Memberships 
Dr. Karekezi is an active member of multiple local and international neurosurgical societies in order to raise awareness of neurosurgical needs in low- and middle-income countries, inspire young women, and be in a position to make change. These societies include, American Association of Neurological surgeons (AANS), Congress of neurological Surgeons (CNS), the AANS/CNS section on tumors, WFNS-Women In Neurosurgery (WIN) Committee, Women in Neurosurgery (WINS/USA), African Women in Neurosurgery (AWIN), College of Surgeons of East, Central and Southern Africa (COSECSA), Society for Neuro-Oncology (SNO), North American Skull Base Society (NASBS), Women in Surgery AFRICA, the African Organization for Research and Training in Cancer (AORTIC), Society for Neuro-Oncology/SSA (SNOSSA), Rwanda Medical Association, Rwanda Surgical Society, and Rwanda Association of Neurological Surgeons.

Publications 
 Adult brain tumors in Sub-Saharan Africa: A scoping review. PMID 35397473.
 Emphasizing the Role of Neurosurgery Within Global Health and National Health Systems: A Call to Action. PMID 34708069
 Neurosurgeons' experiences of conducting and disseminating clinical research in low-income and middle-income countries: a reflexive thematic analysis. PMID 34551952.
 Haizel-Cobbina J, Chen JW, Belete A, Dewan MC, Karekezi C. The landscape of neuro-oncology in East Africa: a review of published records. PMID 34468839.
 Needs of Young African Neurosurgeons and Residents: A Cross-Sectional Study. PMID 34124134
 State of Neurosurgical Education in Africa: A Narrative Review. PMID 34058355.
 Decompressive craniotomy: an international survey of practice. PMID 33738561.
 Neurotrauma clinicians' perspectives on the contextual challenges associated with long-term follow-up following traumatic brain injury in low-income and middle-income countries: a qualitative study protocol. PMID 33664068.
 Investing in the future: a call for strategies to empower and expand representation of women in neurosurgery worldwide. PMID 33789242.
 History of African women in neurosurgery. PMID 33789234.
 Women in Neurosurgery (WIN): Barriers to Progress, World WIN Directory and the Way Forward. PMID 33708650
 Neurosurgeons' experiences of conducting and disseminating clinical research in low- and middle-income countries: a qualitative study protocol. PMID 32792451
 The WFNS Young Neurosurgeons Survey (Part I): Demographics, Resources and Education. 
 The WFNS Young Neurosurgeons Survey (Part II): Barriers to Professional Development and Service Delivery in Neurosurgery.
 Global Perspectives on Task Shifting and Task Sharing in Neurosurgery. PMID 32309801
 Task-Shifting and Task-Sharing in Neurosurgery: An International Survey of Current Practices in Low- and Middle-Income Countries. PMID 32309800;
 The impact of African-trained neurosurgeons on sub-Saharan Africa. Neurosurg Focus. 2020 Mar 1 ;48(3):E4. doi: 10.3171/2019.12.FOCUS19853. PMID 32114560.
 Rare case of giant pediatric cavernous angioma of the temporal lobe: A case report and review of the literature. PMID 31966926
 Perspectives on surgical oncology in Africa. PMID 31521388.
 Management of Giant Pituitary Adenomas: Role and Outcome of the Endoscopic Endonasal Surgical Approach. PMID 31471050.
 Pituitary Apoplexy: Results of Surgical and Conservative Management Clinical Series and Review of the Literature. PMID 31302273.
 Takeoff of African Neurosurgery and the World Federation of Neurosurgical Societies Rabat Training Center Alumni. PMID 30910756.
Expanded Endoscopic Endonasal Approach for Resection of Intradural Chordoma: Surgical and Anatomic Nuances: 2-Dimensional Operative Video. Oper Neurosurg (Hagerstown). PMID 30566687
 Global neurosurgery: models for international surgical education and collaboration at one university.  PMID 30269576.
 Extended Endoscopic Approach for Resection of Craniopharyngiomas. PMID 29404251.
 Unusual coexistence of an epidermoid cyst with an atypical meningioma: Case report and review of the literature. PMID 27069741.
 Tuberculosis of lower cervical spine (C4-C5) with severe angulation. PMID 26008681.
 Cervical spondylotic myelopathy: clinical and radiological outcome of surgery on a series of 135 patients who underwent at neurosurgery department of CHU Avicenna. PMID 25667691
 Multiple intracranial meningioma: experience of the neurosurgery service of Avicenna Hospital Rabat-Salé, about 4 cases and review of the literature. Pan Afr Med J. 2014 Jul 6; 18:204.  PMID 25419331
 Are infundibular dilatations at risk of further transformation? Ten-year progression of a prior documented infundibulum into a saccular aneurysm and rupture: Case report and a review of the literature. PMID: 25239381.
 Unusual cause of non-discogenic sciatica: Foraminal lumbar root schwannoma. PMID 25184102.

References

External links 

Women neuroscientists
Neuroscientists
Rwandan women scientists
1982 births
Living people